The Great Midwest Hockey League (GMHL) is an ACHA Division 2 club ice hockey league consisting of teams in the Great Lakes region of the United States.

2018-2019 Teams

Former teams
Central Michigan University
Ferris State University - Began competing in ACHA Division 3 beginning 2017.
Miami University - Began competing in the Tri-State Collegiate Hockey League in 2017.
Oakland University - An original member of the GMHL, Oakland University left after the 2005-06 season as the team transitioned to ACHA Division 1.
Ohio State University - Began competing in the Tri-State Collegiate Hockey League in 2016.
Robert Morris College - Chicago
University of Dayton
University of Illinois
Club Ice Hockey at Indiana University- As of the 2019-2020 season, Indiana plays in the Tri-State Collegiate Hockey League

See also
American Collegiate Hockey Association
List of ice hockey leagues

References

External links
GMHL site

ACHA Division 2 conferences